Derrick Brown may refer to:

 Derrick Brown (basketball, born 1973), American basketball player who was best import of the Philippine Basketball Association
 Derrick Brown (basketball, born 1987), American basketball player
 Derrick Brown (long jumper) (born 1968), British long jumper
 Derrick C. Brown (born 1973), American poet
 Derrick Brown (American football) (born 1998), American football defensive tackle

See also
 Derek Brown (disambiguation)